Pentila amenaida is a butterfly in the family Lycaenidae. It is found in Angola.

References

Butterflies described in 1873
Poritiinae
Endemic fauna of Angola
Butterflies of Africa
Taxa named by William Chapman Hewitson